Quaye is a common Ghanaian surname. Notable people with the surname include:

Abdullah Quaye (born 1980), Ghanaian football midfielder
Benjamin W. Quartey Quaye Papafio (1859–1924), physician and politician in the Gold Coast
Caleb Quaye (born 1948), English Afro-European rock guitarist and studio musician
Daniel Quaye (born 1980), Ghanaian football defender
Finley Quaye (born 1974), Scottish musician
Ko Quaye (born 1987), Canadian football defensive tackle
Lawrence Quaye (born 1984), Ghana born naturalized Qatari footballer
Paul Quaye (born 1995), Spanish-born Ghanaian footballer
Peter Ofori-Quaye (born 1980), Ghanaian professional association football player
Philemon Quaye (1924–2010), Ghanaian soldier, politician, diplomat and religious leader
Raphael M. Quaye (born 1975), Liberian basketball player
Shamo Quaye (1971–1997), Ghanaian footballer
Terri Quaye (born 1940), English singer, pianist, and percussionist